Silvia Maria Johannes Pepels (born 6 January 1975 in Stein, Limburg (Netherlands)) is an athlete from the Netherlands.  She competes in triathlon.

Pepels competed at the first Olympic triathlon at the 2000 Summer Olympics.  She took twenty-sixth place with a total time of 2:07:05.01.

References

1975 births
Living people
Dutch female triathletes
Triathletes at the 2000 Summer Olympics
Olympic triathletes of the Netherlands
People from Stein, Limburg
Sportspeople from Limburg (Netherlands)